The International Symmetry Society ("International Society for the Interdisciplinary Study of Symmetry"; abbreviated name SIS) is an international non-governmental, non-profit organization registered in Hungary (Budapest, Vármegye u. 7. II. 3., H-1052).
Its main objectives are: 
 to bring together artists and scientists, educators and students devoted to, or interested in, the research and understanding of the concept and application of symmetry (asymmetry, dissymmetry);
 to provide regular information to the general public about events in symmetry studies;
 to ensure a regular forum (including the organization of symposia, and the publication of a periodical) for all those interested in symmetry studies.

The topic was introduced for the first time by Russian and Polish scholars. Then in 1952, Hermann Weyl published his fascinating book Symmetry, which was later translated into 10 languages. Since then, it became an attractive subject of research in various fields. A variety of manifestations of the principle of symmetry in sculpture, painting, architecture, ornament, and design, in organic and inorganic nature, has been revealed; the philosophical and mathematical significance of this principle has been studied.
During the 1980s the discussions concerning the nature of the world, whether it was essentially probabilistic or naturally geometric, revived the interest of the researchers to the topic. The intellectual atmosphere of this period facilitated the idea of establishment of a new institution devoted to the study of all forms of complexity and patterns of symmetry and orderly structures pervading science, nature and society, which ultimately led to the establishment of the International Society for the Interdisciplinary Study of Symmetry.

The Society's community comprises several branches of science and art, while symmetry studies have gained the rank of an individual interdisciplinary field in the judgement of the scientific community. The Society has members in all continents, in over forty countries.

The Society was founded in 1989 following a successful international meeting in Budapest. 
It has operated continuously since its foundation, publishing printed and web journals and hosting an International Congress and Exhibition entitled Symmetry: Art and Science every three years:

 1989 in Budapest, Hungary
 1992 in Hiroshima, Japan
 1995 in Washington DC, US
 1998 in Haifa, Israel
 2001 in Sydney, Australia
 2004 in Tihany, Hungary
 2007 in Buenos Aires, Argentina
 2010 in Gmünd, Austria
 2013 in Crete, Greece
 2016 in Adelaide, Australia
2019 in Kanazawa, Japan

Interim full conferences have been held in 
 Tsukuba Science City (co-organized with Katachi no kagaku kai, Japan), 1994 and 1998
 Brussels (2002)
 Lviv [Lemberg] (2008)
 Kraków and Wroclaw (2008).

A new series of conferences under the general heading Logics of Image have been launched on 2013, planned to take place every two years. This series is co-organised with the Research Group on Universal Logic:
 ISSC 2016: Logics of Image - Visualization, Iconicity, Imagination and Human Creativity, in Santorini, Greece
 ISSC 2018: Logics of Image - Visual Learning, Logic and Philosophy of Form in East and West, in Crete, Greece

The President of the International Society for the Interdisciplinary Study of Symmetry is Dénes Nagy.
The Society is governed by a number of special Boards and Committees.
The International Advisory Board consists of:
 Rima Ajlouni (United States of America)
 Alireza Behnejad (UK), 
 Beth Cardier (Australia)
 Oleh Bodnar (Ukraine), 
 Beth Cardier (Australia), 
 Liu Dun (China), 
 Shozo Isihara (Japan), 
 Ritsuko Izuhara (Japan), 
 Eugene Katz (Israel), 
 Patricia Muñoz (Argentina, representing SEMA), 
 Janusz Rębielak (Poland), 
 Vera Viana (Portugal).
 Dmitry Weise (Russia).

Among the Honorary Members of the Society are:
 Carol Bier (USA)
 Jürgen Bokowski (Germany)
 Michael Burt (Israel)
 Donald Crowe ([United States of America])
 Istvan Hargittai (Hungary)
 William Huff ([United States of America])
 Peter Klein (Germany)
 Koryo Miura (Japan)
 Tohru Ogawa (Japan)
 Werner Schulze (Austria)
 Caspar Schwabe (Switzerland)
 Dan Shechtman (Israel)
 Ryuji Takaki (Japan)

Honorary Members of the Society (died)
 Johann Jakob Burckhardt (Switzerland)
 Harold S. M. Coxeter (Canada)
 Victor A. Frank-Kamenetsky (Russia)
 Heinrich Heesch (Germany)
 Kodi Husimi (Japan)
 Michael Longuet-Higgins (UK and [United States of America])
 Yuval Ne’eman (Israel)
 Ilarion I. Shafranovskii (Russia)
 Cyril Smith ([United States of America])
 Eugene P. Wigner ([United States of America])

External links
Home Page
 Facebook site

References 

Organizations established in 1989
Symmetry